Ronald Reagan, the 40th president of the United States, ran for president four times:

 Ronald Reagan 1968 presidential campaign, an unsuccessful campaign Ronald Reagan conducted in 1968
 Ronald Reagan 1976 presidential campaign, another unsuccessful campaign Reagan conducted in 1976
 Ronald Reagan 1980 presidential campaign, the successful election campaign Reagan conducted in 1980
 Ronald Reagan 1984 presidential campaign, the successful reelection campaign Reagan conducted in 1984